By Surprise may refer to:

 By Surprise (album), an album by Joy Williams
 By Surprise (band), an American indie rock band
 By Surprise, a song from Peter, Paul and Mary's reunion album in 1978